The 2018 Pan American Youth Olympic Games Qualifier for boys' field hockey, also known as 2018 Youth Pan American Championship, was an international field hockey competition which served as a qualification for the 2018 Summer Youth Olympics. The event was held from 12 – 17 March 2018 in Guadalajara, Mexico.

The winner and runner-up of this tournament will qualify for the 2018 Summer Youth Olympics. Argentina and Mexico became the winner and runner-up. However, since Argentina had already qualified at the host nation, the third placed team (Canada) has also qualified.

Participating nations
Alongside the host nation, 7 teams competed in the tournament.

Results

All times are local (UTC-6). Each game lasts for 20 minutes

First round

Pool A

Pool B

Second round

Quarterfinals

Fifth to eighth place classification

Crossover

Seventh and eighth place

Fifth and sixth place

First to fourth place classification

Semi-finals

Third and fourth place

Final

Final standings

Goalscorers
9 goals

 Facundo Sarto
 Vinicius Vaz
 Luis Villegas

7 goals

 Ignacio Ibarra
 Pedro Inaudi

6 goals

 Tadeo Marcucci
 Erik Hernández

5 goals

 Martin Fernández
 Gabriel Martins
 Shazab Butt
 Rowan Childs
 Amraaz Dhillion

4 goals

 Lisandro Zago
 Lucas Lemos
 Matheus Oliveira
 Isaac Farion
 Brendan Guraliuk
 Shemar Gordon
 Deandre Smalling
 Jorge Estrada

3 goals

 Nickoy Stephenson
 Jorge Gomez
 Juan Sosa
 Santiago Chamorro

2 goals

 Santiago Micaz
 Brayan Pérez
 Bryan Froelich
 Ganga Singh
 Alexander Medina
 Daneudi de Mora
 Anyelo Quezada
 Carlos Villatoro
 Gifford Harding
 Alexander Palma
 Elias Vera

1 goal

 Paulo Monsores
 Arjun Hothi
 Ramon Dominguez
 Kevin Borrayo
 Abel Calderón
 Jason Pineda
 Christopher Reid
 Brayan Pérez
 Aram Monges
 Alexis Pereira
 Federico Ruetalo

References

Pan American Youth Olympic Games Qualifier (boys' field hockey)
International field hockey competitions hosted by Mexico
Pan American Youth Olympic Games Qualifier (boys' field hockey)
Pan American Youth Olympic Games Qualifier (boys' field hockey)